Griffin Hill is a mountain located in the Catskill Mountains of New York south of Hobart. Lyon Mountain is located south of Griffin Hill and Mount Bob is located north.

References

Mountains of Delaware County, New York
Mountains of New York (state)